The 1985 Boston College Eagles football team represented Boston College as an independent during the 1985 NCAA Division I-A football season. The Eagles were led by fifth-year head coach Jack Bicknell, and played their home games at Alumni Stadium in Chestnut Hill, Massachusetts. They also played two alternate-site home games at Sullivan Stadium (later known as Foxboro Stadium) in Foxborough, Massachusetts. The Eagles failed to replicate their 1984 success after the departure of their Heisman Trophy-winning quarterback, Doug Flutie, finishing with a 4–8 record.

Schedule

References

Boston College
Boston College Eagles football seasons
Boston College Eagles football
Boston College Eagles football